A subvariety (Latin: subvarietas) in botanical nomenclature is a taxonomic rank. They are rarely used to classify organisms.

Plant taxonomy
Subvariety is ranked: 
below that of variety (varietas)
above that of form (forma).

Subvariety is an infraspecific taxon.

Name
Its name consists of three parts: 
a genus name (genera)
a specific epithet (species)
an infraspecific epithet  (subvariety)

To indicate the subvariety rank, the abbreviation "subvar." is put before the infraspecific epithet.

References

Species
Plant taxonomy
Biology terminology